A line dance is a choreographed dance in which a group of people dance along to a repeating sequence of steps while arranged in one or more lines or rows. These lines usually face all in the same direction, or less commonly face each other. Unlike circle dancing, line dancers are not in physical contact with each other. Each dance is usually associated with, and named for, a specific song, such as the Macarena (both eponymous) or Electric Slide (associated with the 1982 single "Electric Boogie") are a few of the line dances that have consistently remained part of modern American culture for years.

Line dancing is practiced and learned in country-western dance bars, social clubs, dance clubs and ballrooms. It is sometimes combined on dance programs with other forms of country-western dance, such as two-step, western promenade dances, and as well as western-style variants of the waltz, polka and swing. Line dances have accompanied many popular music styles since the early 1970s including pop, swing, rock and roll, disco, Latin (salsa suelta), rhythm and blues and jazz.

The term "modern line dance" is now used in many line dance clubs around the world to indicate the styles of dance that will be taught will include a mix from all genres, including pop, Latin, Irish, big band and country.  It indicates clubs who no longer wear western style clothing or boots. Participants dress in casual clothing and often wear dance trainers.

History

The precise origins of line dancing are not entirely clear. Of the confusion, music historian Christy Lane has stated that "If you were to ask 10 people with some knowledge of when line dancing began, you'd probably get 10 different answers". By and large, the growth and popularity of line dancing has mainly been tied to country and western music.

It is likely that at least some of the steps and terminology used in modern line dancing originated from the dances brought to North America by European immigrants in the 1800s. Throughout the 1860s–1890s, the style that would later be known as country–western dance began to emerge from these dances. Schools in the United States began to incorporate dancing, particularly folk dancing, into physical education classes in the 1900s, which popularized folk and country dancing as a social activity. Finally, servicemen returning from World War I and World War II sometimes brought European dances back to the United States, incorporating elements into American dance styles.

1950s–1970s: development of style 
One of the first true line dances was the Madison, a novelty dance created and first danced in Columbus, Ohio, in 1957. The local popularity of the dance and record in Baltimore, Maryland, came to the attention of the producers of The Buddy Deane Show in 1960, which led to other dance shows picking it up. The 1961 "San Francisco Stomp" meets the definition of a line dance. 

During the disco music era of the 1970s, numerous new dance styles emerged, including many line dances choreographed to disco songs. The "L.A. Hustle", a modified version of the Madison, began in a small Los Angeles disco in the summer of 1975, and hit the East Coast (with modified steps) in the spring of 1976 as the "Bus Stop". Another 70s line dance is the Nutbush, performed to Tina Turner's song "Nutbush City Limits". The popular dance Electric Slide, associated with the song "Electric Boogie," was created in 1976 from a demo tape of the song, which was not released as a single until 1982. The release of the film Saturday Night Fever in 1977 took disco and its associated dance styles to a new height of popularity. 

Line dancing to country music also became popular during this era, with two notable dances dating to 1972: the Walkin' Wazi and the Cowboy Boogie.

1980s–present 

The 1980 film Urban Cowboy caused a trend for country and western culture, particularly the associated dance, music, and clothing. Over a dozen line dances were created for country songs during the 1980s. Many other early line dances were adaptations of disco line dance. The Chicken Dance is an example of a line dance adopted by the Mod revival during the 1980s.

The music video for the 1990 Billy Ray Cyrus song "Achy Breaky Heart" has been credited for launching line dancing into the mainstream.

In the 1990s, the hit Spanish dance song "Macarena" inspired a popular line dance.

A line dance for the 1990 Asleep at the Wheel single "Boot Scootin' Boogie" was choreographed by Bill Bader. The 1992 Brooks & Dunn cover of the song has resulted in there being at least 16 line dances with "Boot Scootin' Boogie" in the title. Billy Ray Cyrus' 1992 hit "Achy Breaky Heart" helped catapult western line dancing into the mainstream public consciousness.  In 1994 choreographer Max Perry had a worldwide dance hit with "Swamp Thang" for the song "Swamp Thing" by The Grid. This was a techno song that fused banjo sounds in the melody line and helped to start a trend of line dancing to forms of music other than country. In this mid-1990s period, country western music was significantly influenced by the popularity of line dancing.

Max Perry, along with Jo Thompson Szymanski, Scott Blevins and several others, began to use ballroom rhythms and technique to take line dancing to the next level. In 1997, the band Steps created further interest outside of the U.S. with the techno dance song "5,6,7,8". In 1999, American retailer Gap Inc. debuted the "Khaki Country" ad at that year's Academy Awards ceremony, in which line dancers performed to the 1999 version of "Crazy Little Thing Called Love" by Dwight Yoakam.

The arrival of the Country Music Television channel to Europe fed the popularity of line dancing there. In 2008, line dancing gained the attention of the French government.

Based on per capita ranking of MeetUp Groups in the US, Durham, N.C. was declared the line dancing capital of America in 2014.

Wall
Each dance is said to consist of a number of walls. A wall is the direction in which the dancers face at any given time: the front (the direction faced at the beginning of the dance), the back or one of the sides. Dancers may change direction many times during a sequence, and may even, at any given point, be facing in a direction half-way between two walls; but at the end of the sequence they will be facing the original wall or any of the other three. Whichever wall that is, the next iteration of the sequence uses that wall as the new frame of reference.

 In a one-wall dance, the dancers face the same direction at the end of the sequence as at the beginning (either no turn or a full turn, 360 degrees).
 In a two-wall dance, repetitions of the sequence end alternately at the back and front walls. In other words, the dancers have effectively turned through 180 degrees during one set (half turn). The samba line dance is an example of a two-wall dance. While doing the "volte" step, the dancers turn 180 degrees to face a new wall.
 In a four-wall dance, the direction faced at the end of the sequence is 90 degrees to the right or left from the direction in which they faced at the beginning (quarter turn). As a result, the dancers face each of the four walls in turn at the end of four consecutive repetitions of the sequence, before returning to the original wall. The hustle line dance is an example of a four-wall dance because in the final figure they turn 90 degrees to the left to face a new wall.  In some dances, they turn 270 degrees, a "three-quarter turn," to face the new wall.

See also 
 Haka
Chorus line

References

External links
"Complete list of official line dance world records:  "World's Longest Line Dances" and "World's Largest Line Dances" (according to Guinness and also prior to Guinness' world records for line dancing)

 
Folk dance